Cape Jackson is a peninsula in Marlborough, in the South Island of New Zealand. It lies between Queen Charlotte Sound and Cook Strait.

Cape Jackson's history involves gold mining, sheep farming, and more recently carbon farming (growing trees for carbon sequestration purposes).

Cape Jackson is privately owned. The land is reserved as a private wilderness park known as Queen Charlotte Wilderness Park, and is available to the public via arrangement with the owners.

According to legend Kupe left a fishing net here.

Naming
Cape Jackson was named by James Cook on the 29th of March 1770, after Sir George Jackson, one of the Admiralty secretaries and a friend & patron of Cook.

Te Taonui-a-Kupe is the Māori name for the point, literally , the legendary polynesian explorer.

References

Headlands of the Marlborough Region
Marlborough Sounds
Peninsulas of New Zealand